Zardab-e Mohebb (also Romanized as Zardāb-e Moḩebb and Zardāb-e Moḩeb; also known as Zardāb) is a village in Cham Chamal Rural District, Bisotun District, Harsin County, Kermanshah Province, Iran. At the 2006 census, its population was 281, in 59 families.

References 

Populated places in Harsin County